KLTZ (1240 AM) is a radio station licensed to serve Glasgow, Montana.  The station is owned by Glasgow Broadcasting Corporation.  It airs a country music format.
The talk show Live Under the Big Sky airs every Tuesday, Wednesday and Thursday from 9am to 10am. The show is hosted by Stan Ozark.

It and its sister station, KLAN (93.5 FM, "Mix 93"), are managed by Tim Phillips, who also serves as the Program Director. Production staff includes Program Director/General Manager Tim Phillips, News and Sports Director Stan "Boomer" Ozark, Leila Seyfert, Maxwell Knodel, Fynn Sukut, and Keirsten Wethern. Gwen Page serves as the Traffic Manager and Receptionist; Georgie Kulczyk serves as the Office Manager.

History
Founded in 1954 by W.L. "Bill" Holter.

References

External links
FCC History Cards for KLTZ

LTZ
Country radio stations in the United States
Radio stations established in 1954
Glasgow, Montana